Burkina Faso has good relations with the European Union, African and certain Asian countries. France, the former colonial power, in particular, continues to provide significant aid and supports Compaoré's developing role as a regional powerbroker.

According to the U.S. State Department, "U.S. relations with Burkina Faso are good but subject to strains in the past because of the Compaoré government's past involvement in arms trading and other sanctions-breaking activity." Burkina Faso cut diplomatic ties with Taiwan in May 2018 (being the most populous state to do so in the 21st century) and the foreign ministry of China stated it approved of its decision.

Burkina Faso's relations with its West African neighbors have improved in recent years. Relations with Ghana, in particular, have warmed. President Compaoré had mediated a political crisis in Togo and helped to resolve the Tuareg conflict in Niger. Burkina maintains cordial relations with Libya, but recalled its in ambassador in 2017 over issues of treatment of migrants trying to reach Europe, and the reemergence of the slave trade there. A territorial dispute with Mali was mediated by Ghana and Nigeria, which has led to lessening of tensions between the two nations.

Nineteen provinces of Burkina Faso are joined with contiguous areas of Mali and Niger under the Liptako-Gourma Authority, a regional economic organization.

Burkina Faso is also a member of the International Criminal Court with a bilateral immunity agreement of protection for the United States-military (as covered under Article 98).

Bilateral relations

See also
 List of diplomatic missions in Burkina Faso
 List of diplomatic missions of Burkina Faso
 List of current ambassadors of Burkina Faso

References

 Ministry of Foreign Affairs of Burkina Faso